Eucalyptus quadrangulata, commonly known as the white-topped box or coast white box, is a species of small to medium-sized tree that is endemic to eastern Australia. It has rough, fibrous or flaky bark on the trunk and branches, lance-shaped to curved adult leaves, flower buds in groups of seven, white flowers and conical fruit.

Description
It has rough, greyish brown, fibrous or flaky bark on the trunk and branches. Young plants and coppice regrowth have stems that are square in cross-section and leaves that are arranged in opposite pairs and sessile with their bases surrounding the stem. Flowering occurs from February to March and the flowers are white.

Taxonomy
Eucalyptus quadrangulata was first formally described in 1899 by Henry Deane and Joseph Maiden in Proceedings of the Linnean Society of New South Wales.

Distribution and habitat
White-topped box grows in the slopes and edges on the eastern side of the Northern and Central Tablelands in New South Wales, between Dorrigo and Scone in the north to Bundanoon and Milton in the south. There is also a disjunct population near Cunninghams Gap in south-eastern Queensland.

References

quadrangulata
Myrtales of Australia
Flora of New South Wales
Flora of Queensland
Trees of Australia
Plants described in 1899